Action Coalition Party (ACP; , ; literally 'join people forces') is a political party in Thailand founded on 25 May 2018 by Tavisak Na Taguathung, lawyer of Suthep Thaugsuban. On 3 June 2018, the Action Coalition for Thailand Party held its first meeting and outlined its platform and its determination to reform the country. The party's rhetoric is similar to that of the People's Democratic Reform Committee (PDRC), the main pressure group of the 2013–2014 Thai political crisis. Former PDRC leader Suthep Thaugsuban is ACT's most prominent member, serving as chairman of the campaign committee. Also among the founding members were former Governor of the Bank of Thailand Chatumongol Sonakul, political scientist Anek Laothamatas, and retired police general Vasit Dejkunjorn.

On 24 April 2022, Action Coalition for Thailand Party resolved to change its name to Action Coalition Party hoping people will easily remember it in the next election.

References

Conservative parties in Thailand
Political parties in Thailand
Political parties established in 2018